

Events

January events 

 January 1 – The Swiss Federal Railways is formed through the merger and nationalization of several smaller railroads.
 January 8 – A train collision occurs in the New York Central Railroad's Park Avenue Tunnel in New York City killing 17 people, injuring 38 and leading to increased demand for electric trains.
 January 24 – The Thompson Tramway, a predecessor of the Connecticut Company, is renamed Worcester and Connecticut Eastern Railway.

February events
 February 13 – The Pennsylvania, New Jersey and New York Railroad, a predecessor of the Pennsylvania Tunnel and Terminal Railroad, is incorporated.
 February 15 – The Berlin U-Bahn Underground is opened in Germany.
 February – Great Western Railway of England turns out the prototype 'Saint' Class 4-6-0 locomotive from its Swindon Works, beginning a series of successful 2-cylinder designs.
 February – Edwin Winter becomes president of Brooklyn Rapid Transit in New York City.

March events

 March 10 – An antitrust suit is filed against Northern Securities Company, a holding company controlling Northern Pacific Railway, Great Northern Railway, Chicago, Burlington and Quincy Railroad and others.

April events
 April 9 – Underground Electric Railways Company of London formed to consolidate the group of Underground lines controlled by American financier Charles Yerkes.
 April 21 – The Pennsylvania, New York and Long Island Railroad, a predecessor of the Pennsylvania Tunnel and Terminal Railroad, is incorporated.

May events 

 May 1 – Ahead of merger documentation and filing, Canadian Pacific Railway takes control of the Ottawa, Northern and Western Railway.
 May 10 – Construction begins on the Temiskaming and Northern Ontario Railway.
 May 23 – Ottawa, Northern and Western Railway passenger trains are shifted to Ottawa's Broad Street Union Station.

June events
 June 11 – Chūō Main Line, Ochanomizu of Tokyo to Shiojiri route official complete in Japan, as same time, Shinjuku of Tokyo to Matsumoto route direct passenger train service start. 
 June 15
 The New York Central railroad debuts the 20th Century Limited passenger train between Chicago and New York.
 Canadian Pacific Railway reroutes its transcontinental passenger trains in Ottawa to use the Vaudreuil line and the Interprovincial Bridge.

July events
 July 1 – Oliver Robert Hawke Bury becomes General Manager of the Great Northern Railway in England.

 July 4 – Pacific Electric Railway opens its first interurban line to connect Los Angeles and Long Beach, California.
 July 12 – First of the Neuquén-Cipolletti bridges opened for Buenos Aires Great Southern Railway traffic in Argentina.
 July 17 – The Texas Mexican Railway converts to standard gauge.

September events 
 September 1 – Damascus–Daraa railway line completed.
 September 22 – Ottawa, Northern and Western Railway acquires the Pontiac and Pacific Junction Railway.

October events 
 October 9 – The Trinity and Brazos Valley Railway, predecessor of the Burlington-Rock Island Railroad, is chartered in Texas.
 October 13 – Professor Ernest Rutherford of McGill University demonstrates the first wireless communication system between a station and a moving train using a Grand Trunk Railway passenger special operating between Toronto and Montreal.
 October 15 – The Ferrovia della Valtellina in Italy begins operating the world's first three-phase AC railway electrification system on a public standard gauge line, designed by MÁV chief engineer Kálmán Kandó with equipment by the Ganz Works.

November 
 November 2 – Chicago, Rock Island and Pacific Railroad and Southern Pacific Railroad jointly inaugurate the Golden State Limited passenger train between Chicago, Illinois, and Los Angeles, California.
 November 26 – Skreiabanen in Toten, Norway, is opened.

Unknown date events
 The Alaska Central Railroad (an early predecessor of the Alaska Railroad) begins construction northward from Seward, Alaska.
 The Atlantic Coast Line acquires the Plant System Railroads and gains control of the Louisville & Nashville Railroad.
 Serious buffer stop accident at Frankfurt-am-Main inspires development of Rawie range of energy-absorbing buffer stops.
 Narrow gauge Ferrocarril de Córdoba a Huatusco is completed to Coscomatepec, Veracruz.
 Percy French writes the song Are Ye Right There Michael? ridiculing the West Clare Railway in Ireland.

Births

Deaths

May deaths 
 May 20 – H. H. Hunnewell, director for Illinois Central Railroad 1862-1871, president of Kansas City, Fort Scott and Gulf Railroad, president of Kansas City, Lawrence and Southern Railroad, dies (b. 1810).

November deaths
 November 12 - William Henry Barlow, English railway civil engineer (born 1812).

References